Tissanga pretoriae is a moth in the family Eupterotidae. It was described by William Lucas Distant in 1892. It is found in Lesotho, South Africa (Gauteng) and Zimbabwe.

References

Moths described in 1892
Eupterotidae